David Milne  may refer to:

 Sir David Milne (Royal Navy officer) (1763–1845), British admiral
 David Milne (archer) (born 1939), Zimbabwean Olympic archer
 David Milne (artist) (1882–1953), Canadian artist
 Sir David Milne (civil servant) (1896–1972), Permanent Under-Secretary of State for Scotland
 David Milne (rugby league) (born 1986), Australian rugby league player
 David Milne (rugby union), Scottish international rugby union player
 David Milne (Ontario politician)
 David Milne-Home (1805–1890), Scottish advocate and geologist, born David Milne (adopted the name Home upon marriage)